Trends in Cognitive Sciences (TiCS) is a monthly peer-reviewed review journal published by Cell Press. It is one of 14 journals in the Trends series.  its editor is Lindsey Drayton. Journal Citation Reports (Thomson Reuters) lists its 2016 impact factor at 15.402.

References

External links

Cognitive science journals
Cell Press academic journals
Publications established in 1997
English-language journals
Monthly journals
Review journals